John Wesley Price (19 January 1920 – 26 May 1991) was an American competitive sailor and Olympic medalist. He won a silver medal in the Star class at the 1952 Summer Olympics in Helsinki, together with John Reid.

References

External links

1920 births
1991 deaths
American male sailors (sport)
Sailors at the 1952 Summer Olympics – Star
Olympic silver medalists for the United States in sailing
Medalists at the 1952 Summer Olympics